Lord's Castle is a historic house at 211 Hammond Street in Waltham, Massachusetts.

Rufus Lord built the home in 1886 on property purchased from Oel Farnsworth. Lord, who owned a prominent construction business in Waltham, was known for his work on the Company F State Armory at Sharon and Curtis Streets.

The -story  masonry house was built as a private residence inspired by Norman castles. Its most prominent feature is a large three-story circular tower with extensive corbelling and crenellations, details that are repeated on the main block of the house. It reportedly took Lord ten years to complete.

The house was listed on the National Register of Historic Places in 1989.

See also
National Register of Historic Places listings in Waltham, Massachusetts

References

Houses completed in 1886
Houses in Waltham, Massachusetts
Houses on the National Register of Historic Places in Waltham, Massachusetts
Castles in Massachusetts